Sir Anderson Montgomery Everton Roberts, KCN (born 29 January 1951) is a former Antiguan first-class cricketer who is considered the father of modern West Indian fast bowling. Roberts played Test cricket for the West Indies, twice taking seven wickets in a Test innings. Arriving in England in 1972, he played first-class cricket for Hampshire County Cricket Club and then later for Leicestershire County Cricket Club.

Roberts was the first Antiguan to play Test cricket for the West Indies, thus leading the way for many of his famous countrymen including Viv Richards, Richie Richardson and Curtly Ambrose. In 2009, Roberts was inducted into the ICC Cricket Hall of Fame.

International career
Roberts formed part of the "quartet" of West Indian fast bowlers from the mid-Seventies to the early Eighties (the others being Michael Holding, Joel Garner and Colin Croft) that had such a devastating effect on opposition batsmen at both Test and One Day International level. He was also part of the West Indies team that won the first two Prudential World Cups in England in 1975 and 1979.

By his own reckoning, the best spell Roberts ever delivered was during the Headingley Test of the West Indies' 1976 tour of England: "I only got three wickets, but in my mind there was a decision given against me. It was a leg-before decision against Peter Willey, where he played right back onto his stumps to a fuller delivery. I would've bowled England out that afternoon if the umpire had given me the decision." Despite an excellent record in Tests his international career was relatively short and ended in 1983. Imran Khan (former captain Pakistan national cricket team) once described a ball bowled to him by Andy Roberts as the fastest and most terrifying he had ever faced.

One of his trademarks was the use of two different bouncers. One was delivered at a slower pace and was often dealt with quite easily by the batsman. However, this was a ploy by Roberts to lull the batsman into a false sense of security. Roberts would then deliver the second bouncer, pitching in a similar spot to the first, but delivered at far greater pace. The batsman would attempt to play this delivery in the same fashion as the first slower bouncer only to be surprised by the extra pace and bounce of the ball. Many batsmen were dismissed, and many more struck painful blows, by Roberts using this ploy.

Roberts was also the part of the West Indies team which ended up as runners-up in the 1983 ICC Cricket World Cup.

John Snow believes that Roberts saw reduced effectiveness after being overbowled during 1974 by Hampshire and West Indies.

After cricket
Roberts' contribution to West Indies cricket has continued since his retirement as a player. As an administrator overseeing the preparation of pitches, he helped prepare the pitches in Antigua on which Brian Lara twice broke the world record for highest Test scores.

Roberts worked with Bangladesh's fast bowlers in 2001 and again in 2005, and also helped coach India's seam bowling all-rounder Irfan Pathan in 2006. He joined the West Indies Cricket Board selection panel in July 2006. In 2008 he was one of 12 former West Indies cricketers who made up the 'Stanford Legends' who promoted the Stanford 20/20.

Roberts was appointed a Knight Commander of the Order of the Nation (KCN) by the Antiguan Barbudan government on 28 February 2014.

Notes

External links

1951 births
Living people
Combined Islands cricketers
Hampshire cricketers
Leeward Islands cricketers
Leicestershire cricketers
New South Wales cricketers
West Indies One Day International cricketers
West Indies Test cricketers
West Indian cricketers of 1970–71 to 1999–2000
World Series Cricket players
Cricketers at the 1975 Cricket World Cup
Recipients of the Order of the Nation (Antigua and Barbuda)
Cricketers at the 1979 Cricket World Cup
Cricketers at the 1983 Cricket World Cup
Wisden Cricketers of the Year
West Indies cricket team selectors
Antigua and Barbuda cricketers
Cricket players and officials awarded knighthoods
Caribbean Premier League coaches
Antigua and Barbuda cricket coaches
People from Saint Mary Parish, Antigua